Max Otto Hainle (23 February 1882 in Dortmund – 19 April 1961) was a German swimmer who competed in the 1900 Summer Olympics. He was born in Dortmund. As a member of the German swimming team he won the gold medal at the Paris Games. He also competed in the 1000 metre freestyle event and finished fourth.

References

External links
 
 Max Hainle's profile at databaseOlympics

1882 births
1961 deaths
Sportspeople from Dortmund
German male swimmers
Olympic swimmers of Germany
Swimmers at the 1900 Summer Olympics
Water polo players at the 1900 Summer Olympics
Olympic gold medalists for Germany
Medalists at the 1900 Summer Olympics
Olympic gold medalists in swimming
German male water polo players
19th-century German people
20th-century German people
Place of death missing